Lužice may refer to:

Czech Republic
 Lužice (Hodonín District), a municipality and village in the South Moravian Region
 Lužice (Most District), a municipality and village in the Ústí nad Labem Region
 Lužice (Olomouc District), a municipality and village in the Olomouc Region
 Lužice (Prachatice District), a municipality and village in the South Bohemian Region

Other
 Lužice, Czech name for Lusatia